Colonel Jacob Klock (1701–1798) was the colonel of the 2nd regiment of the Tryon County militia during the American Revolutionary War.

He was the son of George Klock and Margaret Catherine Walrath. George Klock was a farmer and trader who kept a disreputable store and tavern next to the Mohawk village of Canajoharie. The Mohawk Canajoharie chief complained to William Johnson "I am under the necessity of complaining again, against that old rogue, the old disturber of our village, George Klock". Joseph Brant and others broke into his house and forced him to relinquish his claim to the Mohawk village of Canajoharie Jacob Klock married Anna Nelles in Albany County on April 7, 1763.

He was at the Battle of Oriskany and other battles In 1777, he was chairman of the Tryon County Committee of Safety.

He died in Montgomery County, New York in 1798.

Footnotes

References
 Barker, William, Early Families of Herkimer County New York, 1999, 
 Berry, A.J., A Time of Terror, 2005, 
 Foot, Allan D., Liberty March, The Battle of Oriskany, 1998, 
 Jones, Thomas, History of New York during the Revolutionary War, 1879
 Penrose, Maryly, Compendium of Mohawk Valley Families, 1990, 
 Taylor, Alan, The Divided Ground, 2006, 
 Watt, Gavin, The Burning of the Valleys, 1997, 
 Watt, Gavin, Rebellion in the Mohawk Valley, 2002, 
 The minute book of the Committee of Safety of Tryon County, 1905
 Minutes of the Committee and of the First Commission for Detecting and Defeating Conspiracies in the State of New York
 The Political Graveyard, 

1738 births
1798 deaths
New York (state) militiamen in the American Revolution
People from Canajoharie, New York